Paul Mercier may refer to:

 Paul Mercier (actor) (born 1962), American voice actor and director
 Paul Mercier (playwright) (born 1958), Irish playwright and film director
 Paul Mercier (Bloc Québécois MP) (1924–2013), Canadian Member of Parliament in the 1990s
 Paul Mercier (Liberal MP) (1888–1943), Canadian Member of Parliament in the 1920s and 1930s
 Paul Mercier (1879–1966), co-founder of Baume et Mercier